Poison ash is a common name for several plants and may refer to:

Comocladia dodonaea, native to the Caribbean
Toxicodendron vernix, native to North America